Two Small Bodies is a 1993 thriller directed by Beth B and starring Fred Ward and Suzy Amis.

The film is based on the 1977 American stage play Two Small Bodies by Neal Bell.

The film was screened at the 1994 Sundance Film Festival.

Premise
A hostess at a strip joint awakens to find her two children are missing. A police lieutenant suspects that she killed them and questions her for days.

Background
The story is loosely connected to the true story of the death of the two children of Alice Crimmins who were discovered missing on July 14, 1965.

References

External links

1990s thriller films
1993 films
German films based on plays
American films based on plays
English-language German films
American thriller films
German thriller films
1990s English-language films
1990s American films
1990s German films